The SBS Cup is an association football tournament held annually in the Shizuoka Prefecture, Japan.

It began in 1977 as several friendly matches between South Korean and Japanese high schools to celebrate Shizuoka Broadcasting System's (SBS) 25th anniversary. It was expanded to become a tournament in 1979 and since 2002, it has been a round-robin competition for national teams and a representative team from the Shizuoka Prefecture.

Results

See also

Football in Japan
 in Japanese football
National teams
Men's
National football team
National under-23 football team
National under-20 football team
National under-17 football team
National futsal team
National under-20 futsal team
National beach soccer team
Women's
National football team
National under-20 football team
National under-17 football team
National futsal team

References

External links
 Official website 
 Official website 
 Japan Football Association (JFA) 

Youth association football competitions for international teams
International association football competitions hosted by Japan
Recurring sporting events established in 1977
Youth football in Japan